King of the Roaring 20s: The Story of Arnold Rothstein is a 1961 American, biopic, drama, crime film directed by Joseph M. Newman, produced by Samuel Bischoff and starring David Janssen, Dianne Foster, Diana Dors and Jack Carson. During the prohibition era the gangster Arnold Rothstein rises to be a major figure in the criminal underworld. It is also known by the alternative title The Big Bankroll. It was based on a book by Leo Katcher.

Plot
Arnold Rothstein gains a reputation in 1920s New York City as an expert gambler. He so impresses mob boss Big Tim O'Brien that he is given a job in his illegal enterprises.

Rothstein has a lifelong pal, Johnny Burke, and makes a deadly enemy, Phil Butler, a corrupt cop. He rises to become rich and well known in gambling circles, often using ruthless tactics, like tricking business partner Jim Kelly into sacrificing his half of their arrangement.

Although he has little time for a personal life, Rothstein impulsively marries Carolyn Green, an attractive actress. He devotes little effort to their marriage, his principal obsessions being to build a huge bankroll and to someday win a poker hand with a royal flush.

As his empire grows, so does his arrogance. Rothstein eventually sells out his only friend, resulting in Burke's being gunned down by thugs. He and lawyer Tom Fowler conspire to make sure Butler is exposed and convicted for his criminal activities. But at the precise moment a royal flush is dealt to him, Rothstein is dealt with by Butler's associates.

Cast
 David Janssen – Arnold Rothstein
 Dianne Foster – Carolyn Green Rothstein
 Diana Dors – Madge (based on Peggy Hopkins Joyce)
 Jack Carson – Timothy W. 'Big Tim' O'Brien (based on "Big Tim" Sullivan)
 Dan O'Herlihy – Detective Phil Butler (based on Charles Becker)
 Mickey Shaughnessy – Jim Kelly
 Keenan Wynn – Tom Fowler (based on Bill Fallon)
 William Demarest – Henry Hecht
 Regis Toomey – Bill Baird (based on Herbert Bayard Swope)
 Robert Ellenstein – Lenny
 Tim Rooney – Johnny Burke as young boy
 Joseph Schildkraut – Abraham Rothstein
 Mickey Rooney – Johnny Burke

Production
The film was based on a 1959 non fiction book The Big Bankroll. The New York Times called it a "galloping account".

The book was a best seller and several companies were interested in film rights. 
In October 1959, film rights were bought by Allied Artists, who had enjoyed a big commercial success with Al Capone (1959) and were interested in making more gangster films. The purchase price was described as "well into six figures as against a percentage of the gross."

David Diamond was assigned to produce and he wanted Dean Martin to play the lead. Gene Kelly reportedly expressed interest in starring and directing.

Allied Artists were undertaking their most ambitious film program in five years, announcing 15 films would be made over 6 months. Several of these had a gangster theme including The Big Bankroll and The George Raft Story.

Producers Sam Bischoff and David Diamond had previously made The Phenix City Story.

The producers could not get releases from the real-life people depicted in the film apart from Rothstein's wife Carolyn. So the only people using their real names as Arnold Rothstein, his wife and his father. People like Tim Sullivan were renamed Tim O'Brien. "To this generation there's no difference between Sullivan and O'Brien - it's an honest precaution," said Diamond.

The lead role went to David Janssen who had recently made Hell to Eternity and Dondi for Allied. Diana Dors had recently relocated to Hollywood. Mickey Rooney's son Tim played the character depicted by his father as a child.

References

External links

Film page at TCMDB

1961 films
American crime drama films
1961 crime drama films
1960s English-language films
Films directed by Joseph M. Newman
Films set in the 1920s
Films with screenplays by Jo Swerling
Films produced by Samuel Bischoff
Films scored by Franz Waxman
Allied Artists films
Films about Jewish-American organized crime
Cultural depictions of Arnold Rothstein
1960s American films